Larissa a female given name of Greek origin that is common in Eastern European nations of Orthodox church heritage. It is derived either from Larissa, a nymph in Greek mythology who was a daughter of Pelasgus, or from the name of the ancient city of Larissa in Greece which meant "citadel". The name was later borne by the Christian martyr of the fourth century Saint Larissa. 
The name is spelled Λάρισα in modern Greek and Лариса in Cyrillic, and based on either may also be Latinised as Larisa.  It is used in Russian, Ukrainian, Romanian and Latvian languages. In 2009, Larisa was the 21st most common name for girls born in Romania.
A Russian short form is Lara, made famous through Boris Pasternak's  novel Doctor Zhivago (1957).

People named Larissa/Larisa
 Saint Larissa (died c.375), early martyr venerated by the Roman Catholic and Russian Orthodox churches
 Larissa Behrendt (born 1969), Australian legal academic, writer, filmmaker and Indigenous rights advocate 
 Larisa Bergen (born 1949), Soviet Olympic volleyball player
 Larisa Blazic (born 1970), British video installation artist and academic
 Larissa Fiallo (born 1983), Miss Dominican Republic in the 2004 Miss Universe pageant
 Larissa França, Brazilian beach volleyball player
 Lara Giddings (born 1972), Australian politician
 Larisa Gribaleva (born 1973), Belarusian singer, TV presenter and actress
 Larisa Guzeyeva (born 1959), Soviet and Russian actress and television host
 Larissa Iapichino (born 2002), Italian female long jumper 
 Larisa Iordache (born 1996), Romanian artist gymnast
 Larissa Kalaus (born 1996), Croatian handball player
 Larissa Kelly (born 1980), American scholar and Jeopardy! winner
 Larissa Lai (born 1967), Canadian writer, critic and professor
 Larisa Latynina (born 1934), Russian-Ukrainian former Soviet gymnast
 Larissa Adler Lomnitz (1932–2019), French-born Chilean-Mexican social anthropologist
 Larissa Lowing (born 1973), Canadian artistic gymnast
 Larissa de Macedo Machado, professionally known as Anitta, Brazilian singer
 Larisa Maksimova (born 1943), Russian mathematical logician
 Larissa Manoela (born 2000), Brazilian actress and singer
 Larissa-Antonia Marolt (born 1992), Austrian fashion model
 Larissa Meek (born 1978), American model and beauty queen
 Larissa Mondrus (born 1943), German stage name of Soviet expatriate singer
 Larisa Neiland (born 1966), Latvian tennis player
 Larisa Oleynik (born 1981), American actress
 Larisa Petrik (born 1949), Soviet gymnast
 Larisa Ratushnaya (1921–1944), Hero of the Soviet Union
 Larissa Riquelme (born 1985), Paraguayan model and actress
 Larisa Shepitko (1938–1979), Soviet film director
 Larisa Shoigu (1953–2021), Russian politician
 Larissa Tago Takeda, Japanese-Brazilian voice actress. 
 Larissa Tudor (died 1926), woman rumored to be Grand Duchess Tatiana of Russia
 Larissa Volokhonsky, Russian-born translator
 Larissa Werbicki (born 1996), Canadian rower

Notes

Feminine given names
Latvian feminine given names
Romanian feminine given names
Russian feminine given names
Ukrainian feminine given names
French feminine given names
English feminine given names
Spanish feminine given names
Italian feminine given names
Portuguese feminine given names
Polish feminine given names
Icelandic feminine given names